Fluberg is a former municipality in the old Oppland county, Norway. The municipality existed from 1914 until its dissolution in 1962. The area is now divided between Nordre Land Municipality and Søndre Land Municipality. It encompassed both sides of the northern part of the large lake Randsfjorden. The administrative centre was the village of Fluberg.

History
The municipality of Fluberg was established on 1 January 1914 when it was split from Søndre Land Municipality. Initially, the new municipality had 2,027 residents. During the 1960s, there were many municipal mergers across Norway due to the work of the Schei Committee. On 1 January 1962, the municipality of Fluberg was dissolved and its lands and people were divided between the neighboring municipalities. The Tranlia and Store Røen areas (population: 196) joined Nordre Land Municipality and the rest of Fluberg (population: 2,110) became part of Søndre Land Municipality.

Name
The municipality (originally the parish) was named after the old Fluberg farm, since the first Fluberg Church was built there. The first element seems to be the genitive case of an old river name Fluga, and the last element is berg which means "mountain". The (hypothetical) river name Fluga could be derived from the word fluga which means "fly" (as in 'the river makes sounds like a fly'), or from the word flug which means "steep side of a mountain".

Government
All municipalities in Norway, including Fluberg, are responsible for primary education (through 10th grade), outpatient health services, senior citizen services, unemployment and other social services, zoning, economic development, and municipal roads. The municipality was governed by a municipal council of elected representatives, which in turn elected a mayor.

Municipal council
The municipal council  of Fluberg was made up of 17 representatives that were elected to four year terms.  The party breakdown of the final municipal council was as follows:

Mayors
The mayors of Fluberg:
1914-1919: Torger T. Hagen
1920-1928: Fredrik Johansen
1929-1931: Oluf Hanvold (V/AD)
1932-1934: Christian Odden (Ap)
1935-1937: Martinius Hagen (V)
1938-1961: Niels Minaberg (Ap)

See also
List of former municipalities of Norway

References

Søndre Land
Nordre Land
Former municipalities of Norway
1914 establishments in Norway
1962 disestablishments in Norway